The red-tailed chipmunk (Neotamias ruficaudus) is a species of rodent in the family Sciuridae. It is found in Alberta and British Columbia in Canada and Montana, Idaho and Washington in the United States.

Description
Females are marginally larger than males. The head is mottled grayish-brown with dark stripes above, through and below the eye. The body is basically orange-brown with five blackish stripes separated by four pale gray, tawny or cream-colored ones. The shoulders, sides, rump and flanks are tawny or buff. The underparts are creamy-white suffused with pinkish-buff. The upper side of the tail is black suffused with pinkish-buff and the underside is tawny tipped with pinkish-buff. In winter the animal's color is greyer and less tawny.

In some areas, where range overlap with the yellow-pine chipmunk occurs, it may be difficult or impossible to distinguish the two species in the field; laboratory examination of skeletal structures may be required.

Distribution and habitat
The red-tailed chipmunk is native to southeastern British Columbia, southwestern Alberta, northeastern Washington, northern Idaho and western Montana. It primarily lives on the ground but sometimes climb trees.

Biology
The red-tailed chipmunk feeds mainly on seeds and berries and sometimes carries these in its cheek pouches. Frequently eaten foods include the seeds of fir and pine, honeysuckle berries, cranberries, whortleberries, huckleberries, the seeds of locust trees and of snow brush, buckbrush, thistle, willow herb, grasses and many others types of seed. Dandelion flowers and leaves are sometimes eaten and the animal has been caught in traps baited with meat. It does not hibernate but it may have periods of torpor.

Breeding takes place in the late spring and summer, a litter size averaging five young born after a gestation period of about 31 days. Most nests are underground in a burrow but tree nests are occasionally used, often placed immediately underneath dense growths of dead twigs. The young first emerge from the nest when aged about 45 days.

References

Neotamias
Mammals described in 1920
Taxa named by Arthur H. Howell
Taxonomy articles created by Polbot